Hajia Mariam Alhassan Alolo commonly known as "Haji Mariam" is a business woman and an Islamic missionary born in Changli, a suburban area of Tamale, Ghana in 1957. She established the Mariam Islamic Center in Sabonjida in 1981 to train women preachers.

Awards
Haji Mariam was a recipient of the Nana Asma'u Bint Fodio's Award for Excellence in Promotion of Literacy granted to her in 2008 by the Al furqaan Foundation, an excellence awards organization that honours Muslim individuals and organizations in Ghana.

References

1957 births
Living people
Dagomba people
Ghanaian religious leaders
Ghanaian Islamic religious leaders
Ghanaian feminists
Proponents of Islamic feminism
Ghanaian missionaries
Muslim missionaries
Female missionaries
People from Tamale, Ghana